The Beetham Highway is a major highway in Trinidad and Tobago.  It runs from downtown Port of Spain where it meets Wrightson Road to Barataria (where it connects with the Churchill-Roosevelt Highway).  It was constructed between 1955 and 1956.

The highway was named for former Governor Sir Edward Betham Beetham. In January 2009, world boxing champion Jiselle Salandy died after a car crash at Beetham Highway.

Description

Route 
The highway is fairly short, running for only 4.8 km from Barataria to Port of Spain. The highway runs alongside Beetham Gardens, an economically depressed area that is the source of many incidents on the highway. It is bounded to the south by the Caroni Swamp and Beetham Landfill.

Features 
The Beetham Highway is a six lane freeway with 2 notable grade separated interchanges at Barataria and St. Joseph Road, the latter of which serves as a direct connection to Independence Square. The other two intersections on the highway are at Central Market and Broadway.

Exit List
The following table lists the major junctions along the Beetham Highway. The entire route is located in Trinidad.

Incidents 
On 4 July 2022, a large blockage occurred on the highway due to protests against a police related shooting that resulted in the deaths of three residents. The Eastern Main Road, Priority Bus Route and Lady Young Road were blocked concurrently.

Description

References

Roads in Trinidad and Tobago